is a Japanese football player.

Club statistics 
Updated to 23 February 2020.

References

External links

1985 births
Living people
Association football people from Gunma Prefecture
Japanese footballers
J1 League players
J2 League players
J3 League players
Japan Football League players
Tokyo Verdy players
Thespakusatsu Gunma players
FC Tokyo players
Montedio Yamagata players
FC Gifu players
FC Maruyasu Okazaki players
Association football goalkeepers